H. japonicus may refer to:
 Humulus japonicus, the Japanese hop, an ornamental plant species
 Hypomesus japonicus, the Japanese smelt, a coastal fish species of the northwestern Pacific Ocean

See also

 H. japonica
 H. japonicum